"Sock It To Me" may refer to:

Music
 "Sock It To Me", in Aretha Franklin's 1967 version of the song "Respect"
 "Sock It To Me", a song by Beautiful People from the 1994 album If 60's Were 90's
 "Sock It 2 Me", a 1997 song by Missy Elliott
 Sock It to Me, a 2013 album by Colleen Green

Television
 "Sock It To Me", a frequently recurring phrase in TV series Rowan & Martin's Laugh-In 1968–1973
 "Sock It To Me", an episode of TV series Bump in the Night

Other uses
 Sock It To Me (clothing company), based in Oregon, U.S.

See also
"Sock It to Me Baby/It's Your Thing", a 1969 single by Lotti Golden
 "Sock It to Me Baby!", a 1967 song by Mitch Ryder & the Detroit Wheels